Roderick Rogers (born September 7, 1984 in Stone Mountain, Georgia) is a former American football defensive back. He was signed by the Denver Broncos as an undrafted free agent in 2007. He played college football at Wisconsin.

Rogers has also been a member of the Minnesota Vikings and New England Patriots.

Early years
Rogers attended Stephenson High School in Stone Mountain, Georgia, where he lettered in wrestling, track and field, and football as a safety. He finished his high school career with 261 tackles and 13 interceptions.

College career
After graduating from high school, Rogers attended the University of Wisconsin–Madison. As a junior, Rogers was a 13-game starter at safety, finishing the year with 56 tackles and three interceptions. As a senior in 2006, Rogers was on watch lists for the Lott Trophy and started all 13 games, earning second-team All-Big Ten Conference honors for the second straight season.

Professional career

Denver Broncos
After going undrafted in the 2007 NFL Draft, Rogers was signed by the Denver Broncos on May 2, 2007. He did not make the team's roster out of training camp but spent the first 14 games of the season on the Broncos' practice squad. He was elevated to the 53-man roster for the final two games of the season. Rogers also began the 2008 season on the Broncos' practice squad before being promoted to the active roster on November 4. The Broncos waived Rogers on November 25 after his first career start against the Oakland Raiders.

Minnesota Vikings
Rogers was signed to the practice squad of the Minnesota Vikings on December 3, 2008. After finishing the season on the practice squad, he was re-signed to a future contract on January 5, 2009. He converted to wide receiver for the Vikings during the spring. Despite the position change, Rogers was waived by the Vikings on June 1, 2009.

New England Patriots
Rogers was signed by the New England Patriots on August 18, 2009. He was waived on September 4, 2009.

External links
New England Patriots bio
Denver Broncos bio

1984 births
Living people
People from Stone Mountain, Georgia
Players of American football from Georgia (U.S. state)
American football safeties
American football cornerbacks
American football wide receivers
Sportspeople from DeKalb County, Georgia
Wisconsin Badgers football players
Denver Broncos players
Minnesota Vikings players
New England Patriots players